was a Japanese music critic and literary critic, active in Shōwa and Heisei Japan.

Biography
Yoshida was born in Nihonbashi, Tokyo. From an early age, he was interested in languages, and joined in club activities involving English and German when in high school. He was tutored in the French language by noted poet Chūya Nakahara, and corresponded with noted literary critics Hideo Kobayashi  and Shōhei Ōoka while still a student. He later graduated from Tokyo Imperial University with a degree in French literature. 

His first work of music criticism was a series on Mozart, published in the magazine Ongaku Geijutsu in 1946. In 1948, he helped establish the Toho Gakuen School of Music together with fellow music critics and noted musicians; the school is now one of Japan's most prestigious music institutions.

He made frequent appearances on radio, and later on television, providing commentary on classical music, and on music educational programs. 

In 1975, he was awarded the 2nd Osaragi Jizo literary prize for his Yoshino Hideo zenshu ("Collected Poems of Yoshino Hideo"). In 1988, he became director of the Mito Geijutsukan. The same year, he was awarded the Order of the Sacred Treasure, 3rd class and the NHK Culture Award. In 1993, he was awarded the Yomiuri Prize.

In 2006, he received the Order of Culture from the Japanese government. Yoshida died at his home in Kamakura, Kanagawa in 2012 at the age of 98.

External links
Art Tower Mito with photo
Yoshida on founding of Mito Chamber Orchestra 
Obituary

Notes

1913 births
2012 deaths
Japanese classical musicians
Japanese literary critics
Japanese music critics
Musicians from Tokyo
People from Tokyo
Recipients of the Order of Culture
University of Tokyo alumni